CLIVAR (climate variability and predictability) is a component of the World Climate Research Programme. Its purpose is to describe and understand climate variability and predictability on seasonal to centennial time-scales, identify the physical processes responsible for climate change and develop modeling and predictive capabilities for climate modelling.

Dr Antonietta Capotondi was elected as PICES WG-49 co-chair representing CLIVAR in 2023.

History

The following is an approximate timeline of CLIVAR and its precedents:

 1985: The World Climate Research Programme (WCRP) initiated the TOGA (Tropical-Ocean Global Atmosphere) (1985-1995), to study interannual variability driven by the ocean-atmosphere system in the tropics.
 1990: The WCRP began the first observational phase of the World Ocean Circulation Experiment (1990-1997)
 1991: Joint Scientific Committee (JSC) called on a group of experts to come together and consider the possible future directions for climate research, building on the foundation laid by TOGA and WOCE.
 1992: The deliberations of the Joint Scientific Committee were published in 1992 in a brochure entitled ‘CLIVAR – a study of Climate Variability and Predictability’.
 1993: The WCRP JSC decided to undertake CLIVAR as a major activity.
 1995: CLIVAR was officially launched, initially as a 15-year project. The launch coincided with the end of TOGA.
 1997: The first CLIVAR implementation plan was published.

Panels and working groups

CLIVAR has a number of panels and working groups based on the study of climate variability and predictability of different components of the global climate system.

Global panels

CLIVAR has three global panels:

 Global Synthesis and Observation Panel (GSOP)
 Expert Team on Climate Change Detection and Indices (ETCCDI)
 Working Group on Ocean Model Development (WGOMD)

Regional panels

Regional panels focus on specific aspects of the climate system. Since the different regions of the ocean are qualitatively different, and given the important role of the oceans in controlling climate over the interannual, decadal, and centennial scales considered by CLIVAR, the subdivision into panels is largely based on regions of the ocean system. Specifically, the following is the list of regional panels:

 Asian-Australian Monsoon Panel (AAMP)
 Atlantic Implementation Panel (AIP)
 CLIVAR/GEWEX Africa Climate Panel (ACP)
 CLIVAR/CliC/SCAR Southern Ocean Panel (SOP)
 CLIVAR/IOC-GOOS Indian Ocean Panel (IOP)
 Pacific Panel (PP)
 Variations of the American Monsoon Systems (VAMOS)

National programmes

There are four national CLIVAR programmes, that run largely autonomously but contribute to the international CLIVAR program:

 US CLIVAR: This contributes directly to the U.S. Global Change Research Program (USGCRP) by coordinating and advancing research within the US to improve the documentation, understanding, modeling and prediction of variations in global and regional climate. It is supported by participating programs in five United States Government agencies: National Aeronautics and Space Administration (NASA), the National Oceanic and Atmospheric Administration (NOAA), the National Science Foundation (NSF), the United States Department of Energy (DOE), and the Office of Naval Research (ONR).
 CLIVAR-España in Spain
 Canadian CLIVAR Research Network
 UK CLIVAR

See also
The VAMOS Ocean Cloud Atmosphere Land Studies

References

External links

Climatological research